Sphinx libocedrus, the incense cedar sphinx, is a moth of the family Sphingidae. The species was first described by Henry Edwards in 1881. It ranges from the western Texas to southern California and Mexico.

The larvae feed on New Mexican forestiera (Forestiera neomexicana), Forestiera angustifolia and Fraxinus gooddingii in the olive family (Oleaceae).

Subspecies
Sphinx libocedrus libocedrus (from Texas west through New Mexico and Arizona to southern California and further south to Sonora and Baja California Sur)
Sphinx libocedrus achotla Mooser, 1944 (Mexico)

References

External links

"Incense cedar sphinx (Sphinx libocedrus)". Moths of North America. Archived August 31, 2005.

Sphinx (genus)
Moths of North America
Moths described in 1881